CJ Fredrick (born July 10, 1999) is an American college basketball player for the Kentucky Wildcats of the Southeastern Conference (SEC). He previously played for the Iowa Hawkeyes.

High school career
Fredrick played basketball for Covington Catholic High School in Park Hills, Kentucky. As a senior, he was named Kentucky Gatorade Player of the Year. He led his team to a state championship and set program single-season records with 900 points and 107 three-pointers. Fredrick committed to playing college basketball for Iowa over offers from Butler, Indiana and Xavier.

College career
Fredrick redshirted his freshman year after sustaining a rib injury in practice. As a freshman at Iowa, Fredrick averaged 10.2 points and 2.8 assists per game, earning Big Ten All-Freshman Team honors. After the season, he underwent surgery for a stress fracture in his right foot. As a sophomore, he averaged 7.5 points per game, playing through a lingering foot injury for much of the season. Fredrick was named All-Big Ten Honorable Mention by the media. On May 5, 2021, he transferred to Kentucky. However, he suffered a hamstring injury during warmups for Kentucky's season opener against Duke, after having had to rehabilitate an earlier injury to the same leg during the offseason and preseason. Fredrick had surgery to repair his hamstring during the week of November 13 and missed the entire 2021–22 season. On April 16, 2022, Fredrick announced that he would return to Kentucky for the 2022-23 season.

Career statistics

College

|-
| style="text-align:left;"| 2018–19
| style="text-align:left;"| Iowa
| style="text-align:center;" colspan="11"|  Redshirt
|-
| style="text-align:left;"| 2019–20
| style="text-align:left;"| Iowa
| 25 || 25 || 28.7 || .483 || .461 || .795 || 1.9 || 2.8 || .7 || .2 || 10.2
|-
| style="text-align:left;"| 2020–21
| style="text-align:left;"| Iowa
| 27 || 27 || 24.7 || .474 || .474 || .676 || 1.1 || 1.9 || .4 || .1 || 7.5
|-
| style="text-align:left;"| 2022–23
| style="text-align:left;"| Kentucky
| 2 || 2 || 30.5 || .611 || .500 || .857 || 2.5 || 3.0 || .5 || .0 || 17.0
|- class="sortbottom"
| style="text-align:center;" colspan="2"| Career
|| 54 || 54 || 26.7 || .486 || .468 || .753 || 1.5 || 2.4 || .5 || .2 || 9.1

References

External links
Kentucky Wildcats bio
Iowa Hawkeyes bio

1999 births
Living people
American men's basketball players
Basketball players from Cincinnati
Covington Catholic High School alumni
Iowa Hawkeyes men's basketball players
Kentucky Wildcats men's basketball players
Shooting guards